Eopelobates is an extinct genus of frogs in the family Pelobatidae. Closely related to the living European spadefoot toad, it is known from the Eocene of western North America, and the Eocene–Pliocene of Europe. It is suggested that the distribution over both Europe and North America is due to dispersal during the Paleocene-Eocene Thermal Maximum.

References 

Spinar, Z.V. & Rocek, Z. 1984. The discovery of the impression of the ventral side of Eopelobates anthracinus Parker, 1929 holotype. Amphibia-Reptilia 5: 87–95.

Pelobatidae
Taxa named by Hampton Wildman Parker
Fossil taxa described in 1929